Blue State is a 2007 Canadian/American romantic comedy film directed by Marshall Lewy and starring Breckin Meyer and Anna Paquin (who was also the film's executive producer). The film was the first effort of Paquin in an executive role.

Plot
John Logue, a dedicated John Kerry campaigner in the 2004 election, makes a drunken campaign vow to move to Canada if George W. Bush is re-elected. When Bush indeed wins again, John finds his employer and his friends took his public vow seriously and he can not help but stay true to his word. He meets Chloe Hamon, a reader of his blog, who wants to accompany him to Canada. On his way, they visit John's parents who are upset about his liberal views because his father is an inveterate Republican supporter. Moreover, John's brother is a soldier who fought in the Iraq War. Later, close to the Canada–United States border, Chloe reveals to John that she is a deserter who was in Iraq as a soldier and is supposed to return there.

John insists on taking Chloe to Canada although he then risks getting in trouble should she get arrested. In Canada, they are welcomed by a community of American expatriates but neither John nor Chloe really fit in there, despite the arrangement of a marriage to allow John to remain. Making a difficult decision to return, John and Chloe head for the border and an uncertain fate. When Chloe is arrested and has to go to prison, John waits for her, and upon returning to the United States, has made a determination that he can make a difference. As the film ends, "John Logue for State Senate" can be seen on a bumper sticker on his car.

Cast

Production
Anna Paquin, who plays the female lead, also served as executive producer of this film.

Blue State was shot on location in Winnipeg (Paquin's hometown) and the border crossing at Emerson, in Manitoba in the spring of 2006. Principal photography wrapped in late April 2006 after a 20-day shoot. The film was the first and only work from Paquin Films, a production company formed by Paquin and her brother, Andrew.

Reception

Release 
Blue State premiered at the 2007 Tribeca Film Festival and, subsequently, was shown at the CineVegas Film Festival in the Diamond Discoveries section in June 2007.

Critical response 
On review aggregator website Rotten Tomatoes, the film has an approval rating of 40% based on 5 critics reviews.

In his review for Variety, Robert Koehler said that "played winningly by Breckin Meyer and Anna Paquin — the pic plays as a breezy, human road movie, only to stumble on cliches and strained satire once it crosses the border."

On its release in DVD format, David Cornelius from DVD Talk commented, "There are a lot of ham-fisted ideals flying about here, and it's all a bit too crudely processed for the movie's own good. But then Lewy lets the politics step out of the way and the characters to step back in, and we leave smiling."

Home media 
Blue State was released on DVD on February 12, 2008 in Region 1 by Metro-Goldwyn-Mayer in a dual sided format with side A being a 1.33:1 pan and scan version and side B having the film in 1.78:1 widescreen. The DVD includes subtitles and an audio commentary by writer and director Marshall Lewy. Sony Pictures Home Entertainment released Blue State in Canada on February 28, 2008 on a single-sided disc containing the film in 1.78:1 widescreen. It has the audio commentary but does not have subtitles.

References

Bibliography

External links
 Official website (archived)
 
 

2007 films
2007 independent films
2007 romantic comedy films
American political satire films
American romantic comedy films
English-language Canadian films
Films shot in Winnipeg
American comedy road movies
2000s comedy road movies
2004 United States presidential election in popular culture
2000s English-language films
2000s American films